Enrique Pérez Soler (26 December 1896 – 1 November 1994) was a Spanish rower. He competed in the men's eight event at the 1924 Summer Olympics.

References

External links
 

1896 births
1994 deaths
Spanish male rowers
Olympic rowers of Spain
Rowers at the 1924 Summer Olympics
Rowers from Barcelona